Brain-specific angiogenesis inhibitor 1 is a protein that in humans is encoded by the BAI1 gene.  It is a member of the adhesion-GPCR family of receptors.

Function 

Angiogenesis is controlled by a local balance between stimulators and inhibitors of new vessel growth and is suppressed under normal physiologic conditions. Angiogenesis has been shown to be essential for growth and metastasis of solid tumors. In order to obtain blood supply for their growth, tumor cells are potently angiogenic and attract new vessels as results of increased secretion of inducers and decreased production of endogenous negative regulators.  BAI1 contains at least one 'functional' p53-binding site within an intron, and its expression has been shown to be induced by wildtype p53. There are two other brain-specific angiogenesis inhibitor genes, designated BAI2 and BAI3 which along with BAI1 have similar tissue specificities and structures, however only BAI1 is transcriptionally regulated by p53. BAI1 is postulated to be a member of the secretin receptor family, an inhibitor of angiogenesis and a growth suppressor of glioblastomas.

Interactions 

Brain-specific angiogenesis inhibitor 1 has been shown to interact with BAIAP3 and MAGI1.

Model organisms
Model organisms have been used in the study of BAI1 function. A conditional knockout mouse line called Bai1tm2a(EUCOMM)Wtsi was generated at the Wellcome Trust Sanger Institute. Male and female animals underwent a standardized phenotypic screen to determine the effects of deletion. Additional screens performed:  - In-depth immunological phenotyping - in-depth bone and cartilage phenotyping

References

External links

Further reading 

 
 
 
 
 
 
 
 
 
 
 
 
 
 
 

G protein-coupled receptors